Balmoral Court, also known as The Balmoral, is a historic apartment complex located at Indianapolis, Indiana.  The complex was built in 1916, and consists of three, -story, Colonial Revival / Georgian Revival style townhouse blocks.  The blocks are arranged around a central courtyard and are topped by gable roofs with dormers.  The building at the end of the courtyard features a pedimented portico with Corinthian order columns.

It was listed on the National Register of Historic Places in 1992.

References

Apartment buildings in Indiana
Residential buildings on the National Register of Historic Places in Indiana
Residential buildings completed in 1916
Colonial Revival architecture in Indiana
Georgian Revival architecture in Indiana
Residential buildings in Indianapolis
National Register of Historic Places in Indianapolis